János Grünn (3 June 1864, Besztercebánya - 5 March 1932, Budapest) was a Hungarian politician, who served as Minister of Finance in 1919. After that he retired from politics

1864 births
1932 deaths
Politicians from Banská Bystrica
Hungarian people of German descent
Finance ministers of Hungary